Binoy Kumar Saikia is a Principal Scientist at North East Institute of Science and Technology, Jorhat (NEIST), Assam, India. He is also the Group Leader of the Coal and Energy Research Group in the Materials Science and Technology Division of NEIST. His research interests span energy and environment in general and in particular chemistry and technology of coal, carbon and nano-materials, atmospheric aerosols, and air pollution. He has developed and patented, both in India and the US, a technology for the production of blue-fluorescent carbon quantum dots from Indian coal.

Saikia earned his MSc degree in inorganic chemistry from Gauhati University in 2001 and PhD degree from Dibrugarh University in 2008 for a thesis titled “Some aspects of the structural investigation of Assam coal”.

Honours and awards

The honours and awards conferred on Saikia include:

 Shanti Swarup Bhatnagar Prize for Science and Technology in 2021 for his contributions to earth, atmosphere, ocean and planetary sciences
 Prof (Dr) MP Singh Memorial Coal Science Award (2019) from the Mining, Geological and Metallurgical Institute of India (MGMI)
 IIME Coal Beneficiation Award (2015) by Indian Institute of Mineral Engineers
 MESA Award (2014) by Mineral Engineering Science Association of India 
 Associate member of Indian Institute of Chemical Engineers (IIChE)
 Fellow of Geological Society of India (FGS)
 Member of International X-ray Absorption Society, Italy
 Member of Indian Science Congress Association

References

External links

Recipients of the Shanti Swarup Bhatnagar Award in Earth, Atmosphere, Ocean & Planetary Sciences
Year of birth missing (living people)
Living people
People from Golaghat district
Gauhati University alumni
Dibrugarh University alumni